Essex is an unincorporated community in Halifax County, North Carolina, United States.

Notes

Unincorporated communities in Halifax County, North Carolina
Unincorporated communities in North Carolina